Susan Fletcher (born May 28, 1951) is an American writer of fiction, primarily speculative fiction for children or young adults. She was born in Pasadena, California and has worked from Wilsonville, Oregon.

Her first book was Dragon's Milk, a fantasy novel from Jean Karl Books at Atheneum in 1989. Three more Dragon Chronicles have followed, the latest in 2010.

Works

 Dragon Chronicles (Atheneum Books for Young Readers, 1989–2010)
 Dragon's Milk (1989) 
 Flight of the Dragon Kyn (1993)
 Sign of the Dove (1996)
 Ancient, Strange, and Lovely (2010)
 The Stuttgart Nanny Mafia (Atheneum, 1991) 
 Shadow Spinner (1998), illus. Dave Kramer, "re-telling of Shahrazad and the Tales of the Arabian Nights"
 Walk Across the Sea (2001)
 Alphabet of Dreams (2006)
 Dadblamed, Union Army Cow (Candlewick, 2007), picture book illustrated by Kimberly Bulcken Root
 Falcon in the Glass (2013)

Shadow Spinner, Alphabet of Dreams, and Dragon's Milk have been published in German-language editions since 2002.

References

External links

 
 
 
 

20th-century American novelists
21st-century American novelists
American children's writers
American fantasy writers
American women novelists
1951 births
Living people
Writers from Pasadena, California
American women children's writers
Women science fiction and fantasy writers
20th-century American women writers
21st-century American women writers